Kevin Robert McKenna (born January 8, 1959) is a retired American basketball player. He is currently an assistant basketball coach at the University of Oregon. Born in Saint Paul, Minnesota, McKenna played professionally in the National Basketball Association (NBA) from 1981 to 1988. He played college basketball for the Creighton Bluejays.

McKenna was the 19th pick in the fourth round of the 1981 NBA draft by the Los Angeles Lakers.

He spent four highly successful years as head coach of NCAA Division II Nebraska-Omaha, where he guided the Mavericks to four consecutive 20-win seasons, two North Central Conference titles and three appearances in the NCAA Division II Tournament.

McKenna was named the NCC Coach of the Year in both 2004 and 2005 as well as North Central Regional Coach of the Year by the National Association of Basketball Coaches (NABC) in 2005. He finished with an 89-33 mark in his tenure at UNO.

As a high school player, McKenna starred at Palatine High School in Palatine, Illinois before moving on to Creighton University from 1977–1981. McKenna led the Creighton Bluejays to a Missouri Valley Conference (MVC) regular-season championship, two MVC Tournament titles and a pair of NCAA Tournaments. He was an All-MVC pick and team MVP in each of his final two seasons.

He remains the only person in MVC history to win an MVC regular-season title, an MVC Tournament championship, an NBA championship and a CBA title.

In the summer of 2009, McKenna was selected as the head coach of the Athletes in action AIA college basketball team during a tour of Poland and Germany.

Head coaching record

External links
NBA stats @ basketballreference.com

1959 births
Living people
Albuquerque Silvers players
American men's basketball coaches
American men's basketball players
Basketball coaches from Minnesota
Basketball players from Saint Paul, Minnesota
Continental Basketball Association coaches
Creighton Bluejays men's basketball coaches
Creighton Bluejays men's basketball players
Indiana Pacers players
Indiana State Sycamores men's basketball coaches
Kansas City Sizzlers players
Las Vegas Silvers players
Los Angeles Lakers draft picks
Los Angeles Lakers players
New Jersey Nets players
Omaha Mavericks men's basketball coaches
Oregon Ducks men's basketball coaches
Small forwards
Washington Bullets players